Re Kayford Ltd (in liquidation) [1975] 1 WLR 279 is a UK insolvency law and English trusts law case, concerning the creation of a trust over payments made by consumers, in an insolvent company.

Facts
The directors of Kayford Ltd, a mail order business, were concerned about insolvency. They were receiving pre-payments for goods from their customers, and were concerned about this being taken by other creditors. They got advice from their solicitors who said that they should open another account and deposit money from customers into that account. Suppliers of Kayford Ltd became insolvent, and soon Kayford Ltd also found it could not survive. It went into insolvent liquidation and the creditors claimed that the money in the accounts was part of the company’s assets. It was contended that instead the money was held on trust for Kayford’s customers.

Judgment
Megarry J held that the money was subject to a trust. It fulfilled all the requirements for creation of a trust, including certainty of intention, beneficiaries and subject matter. Although he said different considerations could apply for trade creditors, he was ‘concerned only with members of the public, some of whom can ill afford to exchange their money for a claim to a dividend in the liquidation, and all of whom are likely to be anxious to avoid this.’

Notes

References

United Kingdom insolvency case law
High Court of Justice cases
1975 in case law
1975 in British law